Albemarle Sound is a large estuary on the coast of North Carolina in the United States located at the confluence of a group of rivers, including the Chowan and Roanoke. It is separated from the Atlantic Ocean by the Currituck Banks, a barrier peninsula upon which the town of Kitty Hawk is located, at the eastern edge of the sound, and part of the greater Outer Banks region.  Roanoke Island is situated at the southeastern corner of the sound, where it connects to Pamlico Sound. Much of the water in the Albemarle Sound is brackish or fresh, as opposed to the saltwater of the ocean, as a result of river water pouring into the sound.

Some small portions of the Albemarle have been given their own "sound" names to distinguish these bodies of water from other parts of the large estuary. The Croatan Sound, for instance, lies between mainland Dare County and Roanoke Island. The water bordering the eastern shore of the island to the Outer Banks is commonly referred to as Roanoke Sound (this is also a historical name for the entire body of water now known as Albemarle Sound). The long stretch of water from near the Virginia state line south to around the Currituck County southern boundary is known as the Currituck Sound.

Albemarle Sound forms part of the Atlantic Intracoastal Waterway. Early English colonists, mostly migrants from Virginia, settled along its in the first permanent European settlements in what became North Carolina; these were known as the English Albemarle Settlements. Many inland Tidewater communities along the Albemarle today are classified as part of the Inner Banks region of the state.

History
The indigenous Pamlico and their ancestors lived in the region for thousands of years. They traveled the sound in dugout canoes, and trapped fish. The Pamlico often set up seasonal fishing camps for this purpose, retreating inland in winter weather.

In 1586 the first European explorers sailed up the  length of the Albemarle Sound. Half a century later, the first European settlers came south from Virginia, establishing agricultural and trading colonies along the shores of the Sound. The Albemarle Sound soon became an important thoroughfare: small trading ships called coasters carried cargo to and from other colonies, and larger merchant ships brought spices, silks, and sugars from the West Indies in exchange for products such as tobacco (a major export of the southern colonies), herring, and lumber.

In 1663, King Charles II of England designated Albemarle Sound as part of the Province of Carolina; it was assigned to eight Lords Proprietors. One of these royal beneficiaries was George Monck, 1st Duke of Albemarle, for whom the sound is named.

Ferries were a common method of transportation through the swamps surrounding the Albemarle Sound throughout the history of the region. One ferry that linked the towns of Edenton and Mackeys, North Carolina, continued in service from 1734 to 1938, when a bridge was built across the Sound.

Fishing was a major industry in the Albemarle Sound from the colonial period. In late spring, when the fish runs started, planters set enslaved workers to fish for shad, striped bass, and herring. Fishermen sometimes had enormous nets, with some more than a mile (1600 m) long, and they were frequently staffed 24 hours a day. Herring was cut and salted for export to Europe, while shad was packed in ice and shipped up the Chowan River to be sold in northern colonies.

In more recent times of the twentieth century, regional striped bass tournaments attracted sports fishermen to the area. This was considered by many to be the greatest striped bass fishery in the world. But water pollution from industry, agriculture and other development in recent years has depleted the fisheries of the Albemarle Sound by seventy percent.

See also
 Museum of the Albemarle
 CSS Albemarle
 USS Albemarle (AV-5)

References

External links

 Elizabeth City Area Convention & Visitors Bureau
 

Sound
Estuaries of North Carolina
Roanoke River
Bodies of water of Dare County, North Carolina
Bodies of water of Currituck County, North Carolina
Bodies of water of Chowan County, North Carolina
Bodies of water of Washington County, North Carolina
Bodies of water of Camden County, North Carolina
Bodies of water of Pasquotank County, North Carolina
Bodies of water of Perquimans County, North Carolina
Bodies of water of Tyrrell County, North Carolina
Bodies of water of Hyde County, North Carolina
Sounds of North Carolina